The Wadandi, also spelt Wardandi and other variants, are an Aboriginal people of south-western Western Australia, one of fourteen language groups of the Noongar peoples.

Name
There are at least three theories about the meaning of the tribal ethnonym. One informant suggested it reflected a word for "crow" (wardan), a theory that sits poorly with early word lists that state that the Wardandi word for that bird is kwa:kum. A second view argues for the sense of "seacoast people"; one source in support of this cites a word variously given as waatu or waatern with the meaning "the ocean". A third hypothesis has it that the name is derived from the word for "no".

Country
Wadandi traditional country covers an estimated . Predominantly coastal, it encompasses Busselton and the areas from Bunbury to Cape Leeuwin and Geographe Bay. Inland it reaches the area around Nannup.

They were the sole inhabitants of the area for an estimated 45,000 years before the arrival of British colonial settlers at Augusta in 1830, and are one of fourteen language groups of the Bibbulmun (Noongar) peoples.

Language

The Wadandi people speak a variety of the Doonan and Dwordan dialects continuum known as Wadandi.

Archaeological site
Wadandi  traditional owners guided archaeological researchers to a spot on a granite outcrop near Flinders Bay in Augusta which was excavated and reported on in 2021, revealing grooves and other signs that people ground stones to make tools here around 9,700 years ago.

Alternative names and spellings
 Waddarndi, Wadarndee, Wardandie, Wardandi
 Wadjandi
 Belliman
 Geographe Bay and Vasse tribe
 Bunbury tribe
 Kardagur ("between" (the two seas))
 Dardanup (toponym)
 Dordenup
 Dunanwongi (language name)
 Doonin
 Dornderupwongy
 Jabaru ("north" among northern tribes)
 Yabaroo
 Wadandi
 Nghungar (njunga is an eastern tribe word for "man".)

Notes

Citations

Sources

Noongar